Bruno Goetz (6 November 1885 in Riga  19 March 1954 in Zurich) was a German-Baltic poet, writer and translator.

Goetz composed two novels. His first novel, Das Reich ohne Raum (The Kingdom without Space), consisted mainly of dream scenes.  The protagonist, a wanderer in heroic dress who calls young people to follow him, is recognizable as the wanderer and poet Gusto Gras of Monte Verità. The work was discussed by Carl Jung in his seminars, and written about by Marie-Louise von Franz.

References 

1885 births
1954 deaths
German male poets
20th-century German poets
20th-century German male writers
Writers from Riga
Emigrants from the Russian Empire to Germany